Gorleston-on-Sea, known colloquially as Gorleston, is a town in the unparished area of Great Yarmouth, in the Great Yarmouth district, in the county of Norfolk, England. It is to the south of the town of Great Yarmouth, at the mouth of the River Yare, it was a port town at the time of the Domesday Book. The port then became a centre of fishing for herring along with salt pans used for the production of salt to preserve the fish. In Edwardian times the fishing industry rapidly declined and the town's role changed to that of a seaside resort.

History

The place-name 'Gorleston' is first attested in the Domesday Book of 1086, where it appears as Gorlestuna. It appears as Gurlestona in the Pipe Rolls of 1130. The first element may be related to the word 'girl', and is probably a personal name. The name could mean "girls' town or settlement", or a variant thereof, similar to Girlington in West Yorkshire.<ref>Eilert Ekwall, ' 'The Concise Oxford Dictionary of English Place-names, p.201.</ref>

Historically the town was in the county of Suffolk. In the Middle Ages it had two manors, and a small manor called Bacons. The medieval church of St. Andrew stands in the town and by historical association gives its name to the Gorleston Psalter, an important example of 14th century East Anglian illuminated art. In 1832 the town became a part of Great Yarmouth for electoral purposes. In 1835 the parish became part of the Great Yarmouth district in the county of Norfolk. Gorleston Barracks were established in 1853. There were to be three railway stations in the town on the Yarmouth-Lowestoft Line. The stations on the line were Gorleston-on-Sea, Gorleston North and Gorleston Links which all closed between 1942 and 1970. The closest railway stations are now Lowestoft and Great Yarmouth. In 1951 the parish had a population of 24,984. On 1 April 1974 the parish was abolished.

Its main attraction is its sandy "Edwardian Beach." It has traditional seaside gardens and model boat pond. It also has a theatre opposite the pier called the Pavilion. The main shopping centre is on High Street. It has its own golf club. There is also the hospital and a library. There is a lighthouse, lifeboat station and coastwatch station on Riverside Road. In 2023 the beach was voted the best in Britain, and the 12th best in Europe, by Tripadvisor reviewers.

St Peter the Apostle Roman Catholic Church, built in 1938–39, was Eric Gill's only complete work of architecture.

The town is meticulously described in the novel Gorleston by Henry Sutton (Sceptre, 1995) and in Philip Leslie's novels The History of Us (Legend Press, 2009) and What Remains (December House, 2013). Both Sutton and Leslie employ the actual names of roads and retail outlets in their work.

Gorleston-on-Sea's Pier Hotel and beach feature as a key location in Danny Boyle's 2019 film Yesterday''.

Education
There are a number of primary schools in the area serving Gorleston and the wider locality. Secondary schools include Cliff Park Ormiston Academy, Lynn Grove Academy and Ormiston Venture Academy.

East Norfolk Sixth Form College is located in Gorleston. It is a major sixth form provider in Norfolk, attracting students from a wide area.

East Anglian School for Deaf and Blind Children
The East Anglian School for Deaf and Blind Children (for deaf children and for blind children) was established in Gorleston in 1912 and based there until it closed in 1985. During the Second World War the school was evacuated to Aberpergwm House in Glynneath, Wales. The headmaster's house in Gorleston was severely damaged by bombing in 1941.

Notable people

 William Adams (1864–1913) highly decorated lifesaver and swimming instructor
 Jessica-Jane Applegate (born 1996) Paralympic swimmer and gold medalist
 Rowland Fisher (1885–1969) painter, mainly known for his seascapes
 William Fleming GC (1865–1954) highly decorated lifeboatman
 Ralph Jones GC (1900–1944) Gorleston born Australian soldier who was posthumously awarded the George Cross for gallantry
 Paul Derek Gibbs (born 1972) former footballer, approx. 200 club caps
 Peter Green (1946-2020) English blues rock guitarist and the founder of Fleetwood Mac. Green lived in Gorleston for a period in the early 1990's.
 Maurice Kaufmann (1927–1997) actor on stage, film and TV, married to Honor Blackman 1961-1975
 Myleene Klass (born 1978) TV presenter, musician, former member of pop group Hear'say
 Gregg Lowe (born 1986) actor
 Sammy Morgan (born 1946) former pro. footballer, making over 260 appearances
 Kip Sabian (born 1992) professional wrestler, currently signed by American promotion, All Elite Wrestling
 Peter Simpson (born 1945) former footballer, 370 pro appearances for Arsenal F.C.
 Hannah Spearritt (born 1981) actress and former member of pop group S Club 7, grew up in Gorleston
 Henry Edward Sutton (born 1963) Senior Lecturer in Creative Writing at the University of East Anglia and  award-winning crime novelist

See also
Gorleston F.C., a non-League football club who play at Emerald Park in Gorleston-on-Sea

References

Sources
 Norfolk Record Office Information Leaflet 33: Great Yarmouth, (Norwich: Norfolk Record Office, 2006)

External links

 | Blue Plaques in Gorleston
 Great Yarmouth - The Golden Mile

 
Great Yarmouth
Towns in Norfolk
Populated coastal places in Norfolk
Seaside resorts in England
Tourism in the United Kingdom
Ports and harbours of Norfolk
Port cities and towns of the North Sea
Marinas in England
Staple ports
Trading posts of the Hanseatic League